The 1977 Southern Miss Golden Eagles football team was an American football team that represented the University of Southern Mississippi as an independent during the 1977 NCAA Division I football season. In their third year under head coach Bobby Collins, the team compiled a 6–6 record.

Schedule

References

Southern Miss
Southern Miss Golden Eagles football seasons
Southern Miss Golden Eagles football